Terry Fitzgerald (born 28 June 1952) is a former Australian rules footballer who played with Hawthorn in the Victorian Football League (VFL).

Notes

External links 

Living people
1952 births
Australian rules footballers from Victoria (Australia)
Hawthorn Football Club players